The Australian National Bowls Championships and the Australian Open are organised by Bowls Australia. Bowls dates back to 1845 in Australia but it was not until 1910, during the 1910 Carnival of bowls that South Australia proposed the formation of the Australian Bowling Council (consisting of the six states) which duly formed the following year in 1911. The first National Singles Championships were held in 1913, with each state holding the Championships in turn. The Championships were also known as the Carnival at one stage.

The Championships were not held for a twelve year period from 2005 until 2016 when the Australian Open effectively replaced the National Championships. They returned in 2017 at the Club Sapphire Merimbula.

The Championships were severely disrupted by the COVID-19 pandemic with the 2020 Championships held over until May 2021. When they eventually took place not all of the events could be completed due to further problems with the pandemic. The 2021 championships were finally held in April 2022.

Australian Men's National Championships

Championships not held - 1915-21, 1913, 1925, 1928, 1929, 1932, 1933, 1935, 1937, 1939–46, 1950, 1954, 1956, 2001-2016

Men's Australian Open

Australian Women's National Championships

Women's Australian Open

References

Bowls competitions
Bowls in Australia
National championships in Australia